Penicillium neomiczynskii is a species of fungus in the genus Penicillium.

References

neomiczynskii
Fungi described in 2011